Ballad of Carl-Henning is a 1969 Danish comedy film written and directed by Sven and Lene Grønlykke. The film won a Bodil Award for Best Danish Film and Jesper Klein won the award for Best Actor in a Leading Role of 1969.

Cast
Jesper Klein as Carl-Henning
Paul Hüttel as Poul
Inge Baaring as Pouls forlovede
Edith Thrane as Carl-Hennings mor
Ejnar Larsen as Carl-Hennings far
Mime Fønss as Pouls mor
Preben Borggaard as Pouls far
John Wittig as Mejeribestyreren
Kai Christoffersen as Fede Kai
Suzzie Müllertz as Højskolepige
Birgitte Rasmussen as Nancy
June Belli as Pige i omrejsende Tivoli
Olaf Ussing as Instruktør
Henry Krosøe as Tilskuer ved motorløb
Ellen Staal as Servitrice
Maia Årskov as Medvirkende
Poul Glargaard as Medvirkende
Medert Ehmsen as Medvirkende

Awards
The film was selected as the Danish entry for the Best Foreign Language Film at the 42nd Academy Awards, but was not accepted as a nominee. The film was entered into the 19th Berlin International Film Festival. It also won the 1969 Bodil Award for Best Danish Film.

See also
List of submissions to the 42nd Academy Awards for Best Foreign Language Film
List of Danish submissions for the Academy Award for Best Foreign Language Film

References

External links

1969 films
1969 comedy films
Danish black-and-white films
ASA Filmudlejning films
Danish comedy films
Best Danish Film Bodil Award winners